Day is an unincorporated community in Taney County, in the Ozarks of southern Missouri. Day is located in the northwest part of the county, just south of the Taney-Christian county line on Missouri Route 176 and approximately one mile west of U.S. Route 65.

History
A post office called Day was established in 1889, and remained in operation until 1957. Captain Madison Day, an early postmaster, gave the community his last name.

References

Unincorporated communities in Taney County, Missouri
Unincorporated communities in Missouri